The 1987–88 snooker season was a series of snooker tournaments played between 29 June 1987 and 15 May 1988.  The following table outlines the results for the ranking and invitational events.


Calendar

Official rankings 

The top 16 of the world rankings, these players automatically played in the final rounds of the world ranking events and were invited for the Masters.

Notes

References

External links 
 

1987
Season 1988
Season 1987